Bronson Hill (born January 2, 1993) is a former American football running back. He played college football at Eastern Michigan.

Professional career

2015 season
In 2015, Hill was signed by the Buffalo Bills as an undrafted free agent. In his first four preseason games there, he led his team in rushing attempts and was second on his team in rushing yards (92 yards). He was waived during final roster cuts.

Throughout the regular season, Hill was on the practice squads of the Chicago Bears, Miami Dolphins, and the New Orleans Saints.

Cincinnati Bengals
On February 2, 2016, Hill signed a reserve/future contract with the Cincinnati Bengals. During the preseason, he rushed for a total of 18 yards. On September 3, 2016, he was waived by the team.

Jacksonville Jaguars
On September 5, 2016, Hill was signed to the Jacksonville Jaguars' practice squad. He was promoted to the Jaguars' active roster on December 10, 2016.

On May 1, 2017, Hill was released by the Jaguars.

Minnesota Vikings
On August 12, 2017, Hill signed with the Minnesota Vikings. He was waived on September 2, 2017 and was signed to the Vikings' practice squad the next day. He was released on November 7, 2017.

Arizona Cardinals
On November 20, 2017, Hill was signed to the Arizona Cardinals' practice squad. He was promoted to the active roster on November 28, 2017. On December 16, 2017, Hill was waived by the Cardinals, but was re-signed three days later. He was released by the Cardinals on May 10, 2018.

Green Bay Packers
On August 19, 2018, Hill signed with the Green Bay Packers. He was waived on September 1, 2018.

Alliance of American Football
In 2018, Hill signed with the Arizona Hotshots of the Alliance of American Football for the 2019 season. He later joined the Atlanta Legends, but failed to make the final roster. He was placed on injured reserve after clearing waivers. The league ceased operations in April 2019.

Career statistics

References

External links
Eastern Michigan Eagles bio

Living people
1993 births
Eastern Michigan Eagles football players
Cincinnati Bengals players
Players of American football from Grand Rapids, Michigan
American football running backs
Jacksonville Jaguars players
Minnesota Vikings players
Arizona Cardinals players
Green Bay Packers players
Arizona Hotshots players
Atlanta Legends players